The Quantum Cloud is a contemporary sculpture, designed by Antony Gormley, located next to The O2 in London. The sculpture was commissioned for the site and was completed in 1999.

The steel sections were arranged using a computer model with a random walk algorithm starting from points on the surface of an enlarged figure based on Gormley's body that forms a residual outline at the centre of the sculpture.

In designing Quantum Cloud, Antony Gormley was influenced by Basil Hiley, quantum physicist (and long-time colleague of David Bohm). The idea for Quantum Cloud came from Hiley's thoughts on pre-space as a mathematical structure underlying space-time and matter, and his comment that “algebra is the relationship of relationships.” The comment was made during a conversation between Gormley, Hiley and writer David Peat at a 1999 London gathering of artists and scientists, organized by Peat.

The sculpture's structural design was by Elliott Wood Partnership while the foundation design was by Beckett Rankine. Fabrication was by Tubeworkers (Structures) Ltd.

Gormley's Quantum Cloud is part of The Line, a series of art works that follow the Greenwich Meridian, through the London Boroughs of Greenwich, Tower Hamlets and Newham.

See also
 List of public art in Greenwich

References

External links 

 Design study from LUSAS software including finite element analysis of the sculptures structure and site construction photographs.
 Project description and photographs by Elliott Wood Partnership, the structural engineering firm that assisted with the design and construction of the structure.
 Interview with Antony Gormley

Outdoor sculptures in London
1999 sculptures
Sculptures by Antony Gormley
Buildings and structures in the Royal Borough of Greenwich
Tourist attractions in the Royal Borough of Greenwich
Steel sculptures in the United Kingdom
Colossal statues in the United Kingdom